Hercules Bay is a bay  wide, which lies  west-northwest of Cape Saunders along the north coast of South Georgia. It was named by Norwegian whalers after the Hercules (or Herkules), a whale catcher which had visited the bay. In the entrance of the bay lies Turpie Rock.

References

Bays of South Georgia